Wilfred Chadwick (7 October 1900 – 14 February 1973) was an English footballer who played in the Football League for Everton, Halifax Town, Leeds United, Stoke City and Wolverhampton Wanderers.

Career
Chadwick began his Football League career when he joined Everton in February 1922 from Rossendale Utd for a fee of £340. He made his debut on 4 March 1922, scoring both goals in a 2–0 win over Bradford City. He was the club's (joint) leading scorer the following season, and in 1923–24 was the leading scorer in the First Division with 28 goals.

He moved to Leeds United in November 1925, where he failed to become a regular player, and soon left to join Wolverhampton Wanderers in August 1926. He scored on his club debut, a 2–1 defeat to Middlesbrough on 25 September 1926, and finished his season with 12 goals. He was Wolves' leading goalscorer in 1927–28, with 19 goals, and added a further 13 in the next campaign.

He was transferred to Stoke City in May 1929 for £250. He played seven matches for Stoke in 1929–30 scoring twice. He ended his league career at Halifax Town from October 1930 to May 1932.

Career statistics
Source:

References

1900 births
1973 deaths
Footballers from Bury, Greater Manchester
English footballers
English Football League players
First Division/Premier League top scorers
Nelson F.C. players
Everton F.C. players
Leeds United F.C. players
Wolverhampton Wanderers F.C. players
Stoke City F.C. players
Halifax Town A.F.C. players
Rossendale United F.C. players
Association football inside forwards